The Church of Our Lady, Mary of Zion is an Ethiopian Orthodox Tewahedo Church which is claimed to contain the Ark of the Covenant. 

The church is located in the town of Axum, Tigray Region in northern Ethiopia, near the grounds of Obelisks of Axum. The original church is believed to have been built during the reign of Ezana the first Christian ruler of the Kingdom of Axum (Present-day Eritrea and Ethiopia), during the 4th century AD, and has been rebuilt several times since then. Accordingly women are not permitted entry into the “Old Church”, due to the reservation of the Blessed Virgin Mary, representing the archetype of the Ark is the only woman allowed within its premises.

History 

Since its founding during the episcopacy of Frumentius, the first Bishop of Axum, (known in Ethiopia as Abune Selama Kesatie Birhan or "Our Father of Peace the Revealer of Light"); the Church of Mary of Zion has been destroyed and rebuilt at least twice. Its first putative destruction occurred at the hands of Queen Gudit during the 10th century. Its second, confirmed, destruction occurred in the 16th century at the hands of Ahmad ibn Ibrahim al-Ghazi, after which it was rebuilt by the Emperor Gelawdewos, then further rebuilt and enlarged by Fasilides during the 17th century.

The church of Saint Mary of Zion was the traditional place where Ethiopian Emperors came to be crowned. And indeed, if an Emperor was not crowned at Axum, or did not at least have his coronation ratified by a special service at St. Mary of Zion, he could not be referred to by the title of "Atse".

The church is a significant center of pilgrimage for the Ethiopian Orthodox Tewahedo Church, especially during the “Festival of Zion Mariam” on 30 November (21 Hidar on the Ethiopian calendar).

Tigray War
In mid-December 2020 during the Tigray War, according to Europe External Programme with Africa (EEPA), 750 people who were hiding in the church were brought out and killed by Eritrean militants. Locals suspected an intention to steal the Ark of the Covenant.

A more recent report by Amnesty International points to war crimes committed by Eritrean troops in and around Aksum, and de facto desacralisation of the church.

The Ethiopian government has blocked forensic investigators from accessing the church grounds.

Ark of the Covenant 

The Church of Saint Mary of Zion claims to contain the original Ark of the Covenant. 

Accordingly, the Ark was moved to the Chapel of the Tablet adjacent to the old church because a divine 'heat' from the Tablets had cracked the stones of its previous inner sanctum. The Ethiopian Empress Menen funded the construction of the new present chapel. 

According to pious tradition, the Ark came to Ethiopia with Crown prince Menelik I after he visited his father King Solomon in Jerusalem.

In 9 June 1992, a former professor of Ethiopian Studies at the University of London, Edward Ullendorff,  declared that he personally examined the ark contained within the church in 1941 while serving as an officer of the British army. He described the ark as empty, and a “Middle- to late-medieval construction [from] when these were fabricated ad hoc."

At present time,  only the guardian monk may view the Ark, in accordance with the Biblical accounts of the dangers of doing so for non-Kohanim. This lack of accessibility, and questions about the account as a whole, has led Ethiopians and foreign scholars alike to express doubt about the veracity of the claim.  The guardian monk is appointed for life by his predecessor before the predecessor dies.  If the incumbent guardian dies without naming a successor, then the monks of the monastery hold an election to select the new guardian. The guardian then is confined to the chapel of the Ark of the Covenant for the rest of his life, praying before it and offering incense. Accordingly, each incumbent guardian monk of the chapel are known to have eye Cataracts of unknown origin.

Burials
Tekle Giyorgis I, in the churchyard

References

Other sources
Stuart Munro-Hay (2005), The Quest for the Ark of the Covenant, Ch. 6

17th-century Oriental Orthodox church buildings
Buildings and structures in Axum
Ethiopian Orthodox Tewahedo church buildings
17th-century churches in Ethiopia